The 1997 Hungarian Grand Prix (formally the XIII Marlboro Magyar Nagydij) was a Formula One motor race held at Hungaroring, Mogyoród, Pest, Hungary on 10 August 1997. The race, contested over 77 laps, was the eleventh race of the 1997 Formula One season and was won by Jacques Villeneuve, driving a Williams-Renault, with Damon Hill second in an Arrows-Yamaha and Johnny Herbert third in a Sauber-Petronas.

Defending World Champion Hill, who had been having a poor year in the uncompetitive and unreliable Arrows, had led comfortably for most of the race, after qualifying third behind championship challengers Michael Schumacher and Villeneuve. However, a hydraulic failure resulted in Villeneuve passing him on the final lap. It was to be the closest the Arrows team ever came to a Grand Prix victory and would turn out to be their final podium finish.

The win was Villeneuve's fifth of the season and moved him to within three points of Schumacher in the Drivers' Championship, the Ferrari driver having only managed fourth in the race. Shinji Nakano scored his last world championship points at this race.

Report

Background
Heading into the eleventh round of the season, Ferrari driver Michael Schumacher was leading the Drivers' Championship with 53 points; ahead of Williams driver Jacques Villeneuve on 43 points, and the two Benetton drivers, Jean Alesi and Gerhard Berger, on 22 and 20 points respectively. The Constructors' Championship was closer at the front, with Ferrari on 71 points leading Williams on 62 points.

Practice and qualifying
Hill, as defending world champion, until then had experienced a bad year in the back runner Arrows-Yamaha car and was 17th in overall championship standings. But arriving at Hungary, he set the fifth fastest time on Friday practice after just a single flying lap, after sitting for 55 minutes in the garage while his mechanics tore the gearbox off the car, looking for an electronic sensor problem. Later, Hill qualified in 3rd place behind Villeneuve, with Schumacher claiming pole position. Hill's teammate Pedro Diniz qualified in 19th position.

Race
Hill made a strong start from his third position, overtaking Villeneuve, and he then caught race leader Schumacher on lap 6. By then, both drivers had pulled away from the rest of the field. On lap 11, Hill overtook Schumacher, and would eventually be leading the race by over 35 seconds from Villeneuve. On lap 74, with three laps left, the hydraulic pump failed on Hill's car, causing it to become stuck in third gear and have an intermittent throttle. As a result, Hill started losing time and was overtaken by Villeneuve part-way through the final lap. Villeneuve won the race with Hill finishing second, and Johnny Herbert took the third place on the podium.

After the race, the problem, which denied Arrows, Bridgestone, and Yamaha their first ever victories (in the case of Arrows and Yamaha, their only ever victories), was diagnosed as a throttle linkage failure, caused by a broken washer worth 50 pence.

Johnny Herbert scored his only podium of the season, while Shinji Nakano equalled his career-best finish of 6th. Gianni Morbidelli returned for Sauber in place of Norberto Fontana after missing three races through injury. Hill's second position also marked the best ever result for Yamaha engines in Formula One.

Classification

Qualifying

Race

Championship standings after the race

Drivers' Championship standings

Constructors' Championship standings

 Note: Only the top five positions are included for both sets of standings.

References

Hungarian Grand Prix
Hungarian Grand Prix
Grand Prix
Hungarian Grand Prix